The Revolutionary Nationalist Movement–Alliance (Spanish: Movimiento Nacionalista Revolucionario-Alianza, MNRA) was a centrist electoral political alliance in Bolivia.

The MNRA was formed in 1979 by
 the Revolutionary Nationalist Movement, MNR; 
 the Tupaj Katari Revolutionary Movement-Chila, MRTK-Chila (faction led by Macabeo Chila); 
 the Communist Party of Bolivia (Marxist–Leninist), PCML; 
 the Christian Democratic Party, PDC; 
 the Authentic Revolutionary Party, PRA (historical faction led by Walter Guevara Arce).

In 1979 presented as its presidential candidate Víctor Paz Estenssoro (MNR) and Luis Ossio Sanjines (PDC) as vice-presidential candidate and in 1980 presented Víctor Paz Estenssoro (MNR) and Ñuflo Chávez Ortiz (MNR).

Notes

1979 establishments in Bolivia
Centrist parties in South America
Defunct political party alliances in Bolivia
Political parties established in 1979
Political parties with year of disestablishment missing
Revolutionary Nationalist Movement